Marali Mannige (meaning: Back to soil) is a Kannada novel by novelist K. Shivaram Karanth.

The novel has the story of three generations spanning from 1850 to 1940. This books is written in Dakshina Kannada dialect, capturing the changing face of a traditional, agrarian, caste-ridden society in the wake of its brush with ‘modernity’ and participation in the Indian freedom movement.

This novel got translated into other 10 Indian language. This books got translated to English by Padma Ramachandra Sharma, has been conferred the State Sahitya Akademi award.

References

External links
 A reading, between two modes The Hindu

20th-century Indian novels
1941 novels
Kannada novels